Rao Remala is an Indian former software developer, now angel investor, and philanthropist. He was the first Indian to be hired at Microsoft in 1981. He was one of the lead developers of the first version of Microsoft Windows. He holds a bachelor's degree in Electrical Engineering from NIT Warangal. Prior to joining Microsoft, he worked at HCL.

Life 
Rao Remala was born in T. Kothapalem village Nagayalanka Mandalam in Krishna district of Andhra Pradesh to a peasant family. He has a bachelor's degree in Electrical Engineering from NIT Warangal and master's degree from IIT Kanpur.

References

Microsoft employees
Living people
Year of birth missing (living people)